Eduardo Fabián Espinel Porley (born 28 June 1972) is a Uruguayan football manager and former player who played as a defender. He is the current manager of Cerro Largo.

Honours

Manager
Plaza Colonia
 Uruguayan Primera División: 2016 Clausura

References
 
 
 

1972 births
Living people
Uruguayan footballers
Association football defenders
Plaza Colonia players
Uruguayan football managers
Santiago Wanderers managers
Montevideo Wanderers managers
Rampla Juniors managers
Club Deportivo Guabirá managers
Cerro Largo F.C. managers
Uruguayan expatriate football managers
Uruguayan expatriate sportspeople in Chile
Uruguayan expatriate sportspeople in Bolivia
Expatriate football managers in Chile
Expatriate football managers in Bolivia
Club Plaza Colonia de Deportes managers